Arjan Roskam (born April 4, 1970) is a cannabis entrepreneur, the founder of Green House coffeeshops and co-founder of Green House Seed Company. Roskam is known being part of the team that bred the Super Lemon Haze cannabis strain by crossing Lemon Skunk with Super Silver Haze. Roskam is also known as the (self-appointed) "King of Cannabis".

Green House Seed Company

Together with Scott Blakey Arjan Roskam co-founded the Green House Seed Company in Amsterdam in 1994 based on the seed collection Scott B. brought with him upon his arrival in the Netherlands four years prior. In 1998, Blakey also known as "Shantibaba" sold his share of the company to Roskam, thus making him the sole owner of the firm. 

Arjan's Haze #1 won the Cannabis Cup in 2006. Super Lemon Haze from the firm won the Cannabis Cup in 2008 and 2009.

In media

Strain Hunters
In 2008, Roskam started a series of documentaries called Strain Hunters, in which he portrays to seek out rare or vulnerable landraces from around the world.

Roskam fell under public scrutiny since his claims of being involved in working and selecting world-famous Cannabis varieties known as "White Widow" and "Super Silver Haze", as well as his attempts to register trademark patents for popular Cannabis seed varieties. Arjan Roskams claims to his success largely contradicts Scott Blakey's life story and work, who is widely believed to be the originator of world renowned varieties such as "White Widow", "Super Silver Haze" and many others.

National Geographic
Roskam appeared on the show Drugs, Inc., in the "Marijuana" Episode, in which he discussed his work in the Cannabis business.

References

External links

Living people
Cannabis in the Netherlands
1970 births